Waldemar Aureliano de Oliveira Filho, usually known as Mazinho Oliveira (born 26 December 1965 in Rio de Janeiro, Brazil), is a retired Brazilian footballer who played as a forward.

Career statistics

Club

International

References

External links

1965 births
Living people
Brazilian footballers
Brazilian expatriate footballers
Brazil international footballers
Santos FC players
FC Bayern Munich footballers
Sport Club Internacional players
Club Athletico Paranaense players
Clube Atlético Bragantino players
CR Flamengo footballers
Kashima Antlers players
Kawasaki Frontale players
Campeonato Brasileiro Série A players
J1 League players
Expatriate footballers in Japan
Bundesliga players
Expatriate footballers in Germany
People from Guarujá
Association football forwards
Footballers from São Paulo (state)